Eaglesfield is a village in south east Dumfriesshire in the local authority area of Dumfries and Galloway, Scotland.

History
Eaglesfield is of ancient origin, and Blacket Tower is the former seat of an old Scottish Borders family, Clan Bell,a sept of Clan Douglas. There is some debate about the origin of the first element of the name which may derive from the Celtic word for a church, eglwys in modern Welsh, or eaglais in modern Scottish Gaelic.

Springkell House, Palladian mansion of 1734.  Additions of 1818 by architect Alexander Johnstone,  alterations and interior remodelling in 1894. 

Many of the buildings in the village are of recent construction, from the 19th and 20th centuries. The village is a good example of a linear settlement, as most of it is in and around a single road.

The small settlements of Gair and Waterbeck are also close by.

References

http://portal.historicenvironment.scot/designation/LB9805

Villages in Dumfries and Galloway